Chaerocina dohertyi is a moth of the family Sphingidae. It is known from highland forests in Kenya and Uganda.

The length of the forewings is 45–49 mm. The head and thorax are dark brown, edged
laterally with white. The abdomen is lighter brown. The forewings are also lighter brown speckled with blackish and with a broad basal and discal dark brown fasciae. There is a blackish ring at the end of the cell and a thick dark line running from the apex to the inner margin. The hindwings are bright red with a black base and with a black submarginal line which does not reach the costa. The underside of the body and wings is ferruginous speckled with black. The legs are whitish.

Subspecies
Chaerocina dohertyi dohertyi
Chaerocina dohertyi strangulata Darge, 2006 (Democratic Republic of the Congo)

References

Chaerocina
Moths described in 1903
Moths of Africa